Ludvig Dornig (8 December 1930 – 1996) was a Slovenian alpine skier. He competed in three events at the 1956 Winter Olympics, representing Yugoslavia. He died in 1996 and his grandson is Slovenian tennis player Blaž Kavčič.

References

External links
 

1930 births
1996 deaths
Slovenian male alpine skiers
Yugoslav male alpine skiers
Olympic alpine skiers of Yugoslavia
Alpine skiers at the 1956 Winter Olympics
People from Tržič